Mantri Developers Pvt. Ltd. is a real estate company in India which has developed properties in Indian cities such as Bengaluru, Chennai, Hyderabad and Pune. Its constructions are used for residential, commercial, retail, hospitality, office, senior-living and educational purposes. 

As of February 2021, a number of their projects remain indefinitely delayed, due to financial woes. Many buyers have been left in limbo waiting for their homes. It has completed 23 projects covering 10 million square feet of constructed area and has an equal amount of area under various stages of construction.

Mantri received CII-ITC Sustainability Award 2012, by the President of India, Shri Pranab Mukherjee.

Founder

Sushil Mantri is Mantri's founder, chairman and managing director. He is also vice president of CREDAI, a body for private real estate developers in India.

Key projects

Mantri Altius located near M Chinnaswamy Stadium.

Mantri Espana, situated in Marathalli, Bangalore.

Mantri DSK Pinnacle: Mantri Developers in association with DSK are developing South India's tallest residential tower in Bangalore. They have also developed and promoted Mantri Square, one of India's largest shopping mall, with a bowling alley, a cinema theatre and food court.

Mantri Webcity: A multi-tower gated-community project on the Bangalore-Hennur road, divided into 3 blocks or 'parcels'. Although partially occupied, construction was not completed on time, with hundreds of buyers waiting for their apartments since 2013, some of them going into bankruptcy and a large majority pursuing court cases. The delay caused widespread protests and a temporary travel ban for General Manager Snehal Mantri.

References

Further reading

External links
 

Real estate companies of India
Companies based in Bangalore
Indian companies established in 1999
Real estate companies established in 1999
1999 establishments in Karnataka